El Clon is an American television series created by Brazilian writer Glória Perez,  and is broadcast by Telemundo. The following is a character list for the Telemundo telenovela El Clon (Hispanic Version). 
Cast and characters
 Main cast in order of appearance 
Original main cast

Special participations in order of appearance

Secondary cast in order of appearance

Theme songs

"El Velo Del Amor"
As the opening theme

Performers
 Mario Reyes "The Gipsy Man"
 Sandra Echeverria

"Ana Baddy"
Theme for Jade and Lucas

Performer
 Mario Reyes "The Gipsy Man"

"Laily Lail"
Theme for Jade and Said

Performer
 Mario Reyes "The Gipsy Man"
Carol Samaha (Arabic singer)

"Quedate Conmigo"
Theme for Leonardo and Christina

Performer
 Mario Reyes "The Gipsy Man"

"Habibi Kilo Kilo"
Theme for Mohamed and Latiffa

Performer
 Mario Reyes "The Gipsy Man"

"Ma Titrikny"
Random theme

Performer
 Mario Reyes "The Gipsy Man"

"Amor Verdadero"
Dance theme

Performer
 Maury Rodriguez

"Mustafa"
Theme for Nazira, Samira, Amin and Khadija

Performer
 Mario Reyes "The Gipsy Man"

"Yo Quiero Mas"
Random Theme

Performer
 Mario Reyes "The Gipsy Man"
 Malikah
 Gerson

Crew
Adaptation and screenplay

 Roberto Stopello
 Sandra Velasco

Art direction

 Gabriela Monroy

Costume designer

 Manuel Guerrero

Makeup

 Alfredo Salamanca

Lighting
 Margarita Castilla

Graphic Design
 Franyell Pinto
 Claudia Rodriguez
 David Durán

Cinematography
 Gilberto Castillejo
 Jorge Parra

VP of Talent
 Joshua Mintz

Writers Department Director:
 Roberto Stopello

Photography direction

 Eduardo Carreño
 Alfredo Zamudio

Camera directors

 Cesar Contreras
 Felipe Sastoque

Music

 Hector Cardona Jr.

Editor

 Alba Merchan Hamann

Original music

 Nicolas Uribe
 Oliver Camargo
 Jose Carlos Maria

Opening theme "El Velo Del Amor" performed by

 Mario Reyes "The Gipsy Man"
 Sandra Echeverria

Production chief

 Andres Santamaria

Directors

 Mauricio Cruz
 Agustin Restrepo

Executive producer

 Hugo Leon Ferrer

Original Story Written by

 Glória Perez

Production of

 Telemundo Studios
 RTI Colombia

Screenplay and original format

 Rede Globo

Produced for
 Telemundo

Crew trivia 
El Clon shares the same crew with other Telemundo-RTI productions such as Te Voy a Enseñar a Querer, La Tormenta, Zorro, La Traición, Doña Bárbara and Bella Calamidades.

References

Lists of Spanish-American television series characters
Lists of drama television characters